Eluvathingal Devassy Jemmis or E. D. Jemmis (born 31 October 1951) is a professor of theoretical chemistry at the Indian Institute of Science, Bangalore, India. He was the founding director of Indian Institute of Science Education and Research, Thiruvananthapuram (IISER-TVM). His primary area of research is applied theoretical chemistry with emphasis on structure, bonding and reactivity, across the periodic table of the elements. Apart from many of his contributions to applied theoretical chemistry, an equivalent of the structural chemistry of carbon, as exemplified by the Huckel 4n+2 Rule, benzenoid aromatics and graphite, and tetrahedral carbon and diamond, is brought in the structural chemistry of boron by the Jemmis mno rules which relates polyhedral and macropolyhedral boranes to allotropes of boron and boron-rich solids. He has been awarded Padma Shri in Science and Engineering category (year 2014) by the Government of India.

Education
Eluvathingal D Jemmis, after obtaining his BSc from University College, Thiruvananthapuram and St. Thomas College, Thrissur and MSc from IIT Kanpur, joined Princeton University (1973) under the supervision of Profs Paul von Rague Schleyer and John Pople (1998 Nobel laureate). Moving along with his supervisors Jemmis spent one semester at the University of Munich and four semesters at the University of Erlangen-Nuernberg. He was awarded the PhD degree (1978) from Princeton. After a two-year postdoctoral work at Cornell University with Professor Roald Hoffmann (1981 Nobel laureate), he joined the School of Chemistry, University of Hyderabad (1980) rising to the rank of professor (1990) and dean (2002). Jemmis was a visiting fellow at the Australian National University, Canberra (1991) and a visiting professor at the Centre for Computational Quantum Chemistry of the University of Georgia, Athens (2000). Jemmis is an honorary professor at JNCASR and an adjunct professor at ICTS-TIFR. In 2005 he accepted an invitation from the Indian Institute of Science (IISc), Bangalore, and joined the Department of Inorganic and Physical Chemistry. In 2008 Dr. Jemmis moved again, this time on a five-year deputation, accepting the responsibility to start the Indian Institute of Science Education and Research, Thiruvananthapuram.

Research
Jemmis is engaged in the study of structure and reactivity of molecules, clusters and solids using theoretical methods. A constant attempt is made by his group to find common threads between problems of different areas, viz. between organic and organometallic chemistry; amongst the chemistry of various main group elements; between polymorphs of elements and their compounds; etc. His research group not only gets numbers as an answer to a problem, but also tries to find out why the numbers turn out the way they do, based on overlap of orbitals, perturbation theory and symmetry, and devise transferable models. Significant results have been obtained in understanding the reactions of transition metal organometallics, week H-bond, electronic structure of three-dimensional aromatic compounds, polyhedral boranes, carboranes, silaboranes, electron counting rules for polycondensation, and structure of boron allotropes. The latter involved an extension of the Wade's Rules for polyhedral boranes to macropolyhedral boranes and the Huckel 4n+2 Rule to three dimensions. The Jemmis mno rules for polyhedral boranes have found a place in textbooks  and are being taught in Inorganic Chemistry Courses in leading educational institutions around the world. Just as the basic tenets of the structural chemistry of carbon has stood the test of time, and led to major developments in carbon, the edifice of the structural chemistry expounded by Jemmis has already begun to do so for boron. Several of his predictions have been proved experimentally. He has mentored 20 PhD students and several postdoctoral and students and research associates, and published about 200 research articles.

Memberships and honors
Fellow of the Indian Academy of Sciences, Bangalore (1992)
Shanti Swarup Bhatnagar Prize, Council of Scientific and Industrial Research, CSIR, New Delhi (1994)
Robert S. Mulliken Lecture, University of Georgia, Athens, USA (2004)
Fellow of the Academy of Sciences for the Developing World, Trieste, Italy (2004).
J. C. Bose National Fellowship of the Department of Science and Technology, New Delhi (2006)
"Prof. T. Navaneeth Rao National Best Teacher Award" in Chemistry (2006).
Padma Shri Award (2014) by the Government of India.
TWAS Prize (2003)

References

External links

E. D. Jemmis home page at Indian Institute of Science
IISER-TVM
INSA INDIA
Electron counting continues to add up
Boron flat out
Emphasis on integrated research

1951 births
20th-century Indian chemists
Living people
People from Thrissur district
Recipients of the Padma Shri in science & engineering
St. Thomas College, Thrissur alumni
Scientists from Kerala
Indian computational chemists
Academic staff of the Indian Institute of Science
TWAS laureates